Secretoglobin family 1D member 2 is a protein that in humans is encoded by the SCGB1D2 gene.

Function 

The protein encoded by this gene is a member of the lipophilin subfamily, part of the uteroglobin superfamily, and is an ortholog of prostatein, the major secretory glycoprotein of the rat ventral prostate gland. Lipophilin gene products are widely expressed in normal tissues, especially in endocrine-responsive organs. Assuming that human lipophilins are the functional counterparts of prostatein, they may be transcriptionally regulated by steroid hormones, with the ability to bind androgens, other steroids and possibly bind and concentrate estramustine, a chemotherapeutic agent widely used for prostate cancer. Although the gene has been reported to be on chromosome 10, this sequence appears to be from a cluster of genes on chromosome 11 that includes mammaglobin 2.

SCGB1D2 expression is high in mammary tissue, and is sometimes used for identification and detection of disseminated breast cancer cells.

References

Further reading

External links 
 Microarray study results where SCGB1D2 is significantly up or downregulated